Hans Nielsen Hauge Ording (17 August 1884 – 18 February 1952) was a Norwegian theologian.

Biography
He was born in Solum as a son of dean Theodor Ording (1837–1908) and Johanne Gabrielle Gustava Andrea Hauge (1851–90). He was a grandson of Andreas Hauge, and great-grandson of Hans Nielsen Hauge. He was also a first cousin of Johannes Ording and Fredrik Ording, and thus a first cousin once removed of actor Jørn Ording, politician Aake Anker Ording and historian and politician Arne Ording.

He took the examen artium at Kristiania Cathedral School in 1902, and the cand.theol. degree in 1909. He worked in Tromsø and Hammerfest before being hired as a priest for Norwegians in Berlin in 1914. He married German citizen Annelise Fechter (1890–1984) in December 1916. In the same year he was appointed as a research fellow at the Royal Frederick University. He finished the thesis Untersuchungen über Entwicklungslehre und Teleologi in 1921, which earned him the Dr. Theol. degree in 1922.

After this he was a curate at Berg, Østfold from 1922 to 1928, curate in Frogner from 1928 to 1935 and vicar in Frogner from 1935 to 1939. In 1939 he was appointed as professor at the University of Oslo, a position which had been vacant for a year, in waiting of Ording to finish the book Dogmatisk metode. In addition to his thesis and Dogmatisk metode, his most important work was Estetikk og kristendom (1929). He later  co-published the works of his great-grandfather, Hans Nielsens Hauges Skrifter, in eight volumes between 1947 and 1954. He died in February 1952 in Oslo, before the last volume had been published.

Selected works
Untersuchungen über Entwicklungslehre und Teleologie (Berlin: Trowitzsch) 1921 
Estetikk og kristendom (Oslo: Aschehoug) 1929 
Dogmatisk metode (Oslo: Gyldendal) 1939 
For tro og tanke (Oslo: Aschehoug) 1950

References

1884 births
1952 deaths
20th-century Norwegian Lutheran clergy
Norwegian theologians
Academic staff of the University of Oslo
Norwegian expatriates in Germany
People from Skien
20th-century Protestant theologians